Since 2001, the executive council of Manitoba has included a minister responsible for persons with disabilities.  This position is not a full cabinet portfolio, and the responsibility has always been taken by a minister with other cabinet duties. So far, every minister to hold the position has also been Minister of Family Services and Housing.

List of ministers responsible for persons with disabilities

References 

Manitoba ministers